Ustad Qurban Hussain Khan belonged to the legendary of  Gwalior Gharana. He was son of Ustad Bade Inayat Hussain Khan and grand son of Ustad Haddu Khan saheb.

Background
He was born in Gwalior in 1901 and died in 1970 in Hyderabad. He was a champion of Khayal gayki which learnt from his father.
He was awarded the title of Raj Gayak by the fifth Maharaja of Gwalior  Many of his students who learn from him become very famous
His son Iqbal Hussain Khan Bandanawazi won many awards in singing. His great Legacy is continued in singing by his grandson Ateeq Hussain Khan.

References

External links
ImportantIndia.com
HardNewsMedia.com

Hindustani singers
20th-century Indian male classical singers
20th-century Khyal singers